Train of Shadows is a 1997 Spanish experimental film directed by José Luis Guerín, who also wrote and co-edited it with Manel Almiñana. The film premiered at the Mar del Plata International Film Festival on 15 November 1997.

It received the Méliès d'Or for Best European Fantastic Film.

References

External links
 

1997 films
Spanish avant-garde and experimental films
1990s Spanish-language films
1990s avant-garde and experimental films
Films directed by José Luis Guerín
1990s Spanish films